Vihma is Värttinä's 7th album, released in 1998. It is primarily pop- and rock-influenced Finnish folk music. However, three tracks (6, 8 and 9) also include Tuvan throat singing.

Vihma was initially released by Wicklow Entertainment in the United States and Finland. Later in 1998, it was released in Japan by BMG Japan. In the same year, "Emoton" was released as a single in Finland.

Track listing
"Vihma" – 4:04
"Tielle heitetty" – 2:56
"Emoton" – 3:32
"Päivän nousu nostajani" – 3:42
"Laulutyttö" – 3:32
"Uskottu ei uupuvani" – 5:05
"Maa ei kerro" – 3:01
"Kylän kävijä" – 4:01
"Mieleni alenevi" – 2:57
"Neitonen" – 2:56
"Aamu" – 4:40
"Kauan kulkenut" – 3:19
"Vihmax" ("Vihma" remix) – 3:32

Personnel

Värttinä
Susan Aho - vocals, 5-row accordion
Mari Kaasinen - vocals
Kirsi Kähkönen - vocals
Janne Lappalainen - bouzouki, kaval, torupill, tenor & soprano saxophones
Pekka Lehti - double bass
Kari Reiman - fiddle, 10-string kantele, berimbau
Sirpa Reiman - vocals
Marko Timonen - drums, percussion
Antto Varilo - acoustic 6- & 12-string guitars, tenor banjo, cümbüs tanbur, 10-string kantele

with Janne Haavisto - additional percussion

Guests
Arto Järvelä, Mauno Järvelä, Matti Mäkelä of JPP - strings (track 6)
Albert Kuvezin and Aldyn-ool Sevek of Yat-Kha - Tuvan throat singing (6, 9, 13)
Richard Horowitz - keyboards (7, 13), Ney (13)
Petri Prauda - Jew's harp (8)

External links
Värttinä page with lyrics, English translations and samples

1998 albums
Värttinä albums